MAXXI ("national museum of 21st-century arts") is a national museum of contemporary art and architecture in the Flaminio neighborhood of Rome, Italy. The museum is managed by a foundation created by the Italian ministry of cultural heritage. The building was designed by Zaha Hadid, and won the Stirling Prize of the Royal Institute of British Architects in 2010.

History
An international design competition for the design of the museum building was won by Zaha Hadid. Her submission included five separate structures, of which only one was completed. It was built on the site of a former military barracks, the Caserma Montello, incorporating parts of it.

The museum took more than ten years to build, and opened to the public in 2010.  It received the Stirling Prize for architecture of the Royal Institute of British Architects in the same year.

The Guardian has called the MAXXI building "Hadid's finest built work to date" and "a masterpiece fit to sit alongside Rome's ancient wonders".

Description
MAXXI consists of two museums: "MAXXI art" and "MAXXI architecture". The outdoor courtyard surrounding the museum provides a venue for large-scale works of art.

MAXXI L'Aquila
MAXXI L'Aquila, in the Abruzzo region, opened on October 30, 2020. This gallery is an outpost of the national museum of contemporary art and architecture in Rome. L'Aquila is a city that has been severely damaged in an earthquake in 2009. 309 people died in that quake. The 18th-century Palazzo Ardinghelli that houses MAXXI L'Aquila had also been severely damaged, and was later restored by the Italian ministry of cultural heritage and tourism, with additional funding from the Russian government.

Collections
The permanent collections of these two museums grow through direct acquisitions, as well as through commissions, thematic competitions, awards for young artists, donations and permanent loans.

The collection includes works by Alighiero Boetti, Grazia Toderi, William Kentridge, Kara Walker, Ed Ruscha, Gilbert & George, Gino De Dominicis, Michael Raedecker, Anish Kapoor, Gerhard Richter, Francesco Clemente, Lara Favaretto, Marlene Dumas, Maurizio Cattelan, Gabriele Basilico, Kiki Smith, Thomas Ruff, Luigi Ghirri, Manfredi Beninati, Vanessa Beecroft, Stefano Arienti, Francis Alys, Ugo Rondinone, Thomas Schutte, Francesco Gostoli, Franklin Evans, Bruna Esposito and archives of architects Carlo Scarpa, Aldo Rossi and Pier Luigi Nervi.

See also
Michele Valori archive

References

External links
 
 

Zaha Hadid buildings
Postmodern architecture
Modernist architecture in Italy
Modern art museums in Italy
Contemporary art galleries in Italy
Art museums and galleries in Rome
National museums of Italy
Art museums established in 2010
2010 establishments in Italy
Art museums established in 2009
Rome Q. I Flaminio